Mevlüt Kaplan (born 1930 Akşehir) is a Turkish writer.

Early life
Mevlüt Kaplan was born in the village of Ökes in Akşehir province. When he was nine years old his mother died, as did two of his brothers soon after. His father worked in construction, and the young Mevlüt helped him run the household. As a boy he was apprenticed, and worked as a shepherd. He was so determined to go to school that he walked five kilometres to another village and back each day. Other boys also did so to begin with, but soon gave up. He was able to walk this distance even in the winter snow because his father made him shoes out of a car tyre.

After graduating from Ivriz Village Institute he became a village teacher in Akşehir. The publication of his story Me and Our Donkey in "Nasreddin Hoca Newspaper", published by Tarık Buğra and his father, led to his being accused and later cleared of being a Communist.

Professional and literary life
In 1958 he went abroad and studied world children's literature in London. When he returned to Turkey he worked as a teacher in Konya, as a primary school inspector in Mersin, Antalya and Izmir, and as a member of the Select Committee of the Ministry of Culture (1996-2000). In 1965, together with Fakir Baykurt and 93 colleagues he founded the Turkish Teachers’ Union. He retired in 1981. He moved to Izmir where he runs the Özgür Eğitim (Free Education) publishing house and where the street on which he lives has been renamed after him.

Legacy
Kaplan has authored 720 books, including six collections of poetry. His works include tales, memoirs, short stories, novels and poetry. He has received d twelve prizes and awards for his poetry, short stories and criticism. Every year a literary competition and prize is offered in his name.

See also
Fakir Baykurt
Mahmut Makal

References

1930 births
20th-century Turkish writers
People from Akşehir
Living people